Jaded is a 1998 American drama film directed by Caryn Krooth, co-written with Wendy Olinger.  It stars Carla Gugino, Rya Kihlstedt, Christopher McDonald, and Anna Thomson.

Plot

Megan is found naked and lying unconscious on a beach. It is presumed that Megan was raped and a local detective begins investigating. As the investigation continues, it is discovered that Megan was raped by two women.  This presents the local authorities with the legal dilemma of whether women can be convicted of rape.

Cast

References

External links 
 
 
 

1998 films
American courtroom films
American independent films
American LGBT-related films
Lesbian-related films
Films about rape
Films set in New York City
Films shot in New York City
1990s English-language films
1990s American films